The 2014–15 EOJHL season was the 48th season of the Eastern Ontario Junior Hockey League (EOJHL). The twenty two teams of the EOJHL played between 40 and 44 game schedules.

In February, the top teams of the league played for the D. Arnold Carson Memorial Trophy, the EOJHL championship.

Final standings 
Note: GP = Games played; W = Wins; L = Losses; OTL = Overtime losses; SL = Shootout losses; GF = Goals for; GA = Goals against; PTS = Points; x = clinched playoff berth; y = clinched division title.

Teams listed on the official league website.

2015 D. Arnold Carson Memorial Trophy play-offs

League Playdowns

Trophies and awards
D. Arnold Carson Memorial Trophy awarded to the EOJHL Playoff Champions:
John Shorey Cup awarded to Rideau/St. Lawrence Conference Playoff Champions:
Dwaine Barkley Trophy awarded to Metro/Valley Conference Playoff Champions:
Gill Trophy awarded to Rideau Division Playoff Champions:
Alex English Trophy awarded to St. Lawrence Division Playoff Champions:
Ottawa Nepean Sportsplex Trophy awarded to Metro Division Playoff Champions:
Carl Foley Trophy Awarded to Valley Division Playoff Champions:

Scoring leaders

Rideau/St-Lawrence Scoring Leaders
Note: GP = Games played; G = Goals; A = Assists; Pts = Points; PIM = Penalty minutes

Metro/Valley scoring leaders
Note: GP = Games played; G = Goals; A = Assists; Pts = Points; PIM = Penalty minutes

References

External links
Eastern Ontario Junior Hockey League website

B
Ice hockey in Ottawa
B
Sports leagues established in 1966
1966 establishments in Ontario